Steel, in comics, may refer to one of several DC Comics characters:

 Commander Steel, a World War II hero and his grandsons, also known as simply "Steel" and "Citizen Steel".
 John Henry Irons, an armored hero inspired by Superman and the folk hero John Henry
 Natasha Irons, the niece of John Henry Irons, also known as "Starlight" and "Vaporlock".

See also
Steel (disambiguation)